Beverly Mary Browne (born 27 March 1957) is a Trinidadian former cricketer who played primarily as a right-handed batter. She appeared in six One Day Internationals for Trinidad and Tobago at the 1973 World Cup, and 11 Test matches and two One Day Internationals for the West Indies between 1976 and 1979. She also played domestic cricket for Trinidad and Tobago.

Her sisters, Louise and Ann, also played international cricket.

References

External links
 

1957 births
Living people
West Indian women cricketers
West Indies women Test cricketers
West Indies women One Day International cricketers
Trinidad and Tobago women cricketers